Albettone is a town in the province of Vicenza, Veneto, north-eastern Italy. It is located east of road SP247.

References

Cities and towns in Veneto